Ju-jitsu competition at the 2014 Asian Beach Games was held in Phuket, Thailand from 12 to 13 November 2014 at Karon Beach, Phuket.

Medalists

Duo show

Men's ne-waza

Women's ne-waza

Medal table

Results

Duo show

Men
12 November

Women
13 November

Preliminary round

Knockout round

Mixed
13 November

Preliminary round

Knockout round

Men's ne-waza

60 kg
12 November

70 kg
12 November

80 kg
12 November

90 kg
12 November

+90 kg
12 November

Open
13 November

Women's ne-waza

50 kg
13 November

60 kg
13 November

+60 kg
13 November

References 

Complete results

External links 
 

2014 Asian Beach Games events